Rabbi David Masinter (born 25 November 1959) is a rabbi, Founder and Director of the Miracle Drive annual charity drive, and Director of Chabad House in Johannesburg. He lectures in Tanya, the primary text of Chabad, and has authored the Grow Your Life series.

Early life
Rabbi David Masinter was born in the small town of Parys, Orange Free State, South Africa to a family of Lithuanian Jewish descent. He was schooled in Johannesburg and went on to study in Yeshivas Tomchei Tmimim at Kfar Chabad, Israel. He received his Bachelor of Religious Education degree from the Rabbinical College of America, and Rabbinical Ordination in 1982 from Central Yeshivas Tomchei Tmimim, Brooklyn, New York.

Career

Upon Ordination, Rabbi Masinter worked for Chabad's newly founded children's organization, Tzivos Hashem (The Army of G-d) and was tasked with revitalizing its children's magazine – Moshiach Times. It was at this stage that he met Al Jaffee, the artist for Mad Magazine and convinced him to develop the Shpy character (pronounced Spy with a Sh..) for Mashiach Times. This liaison has lasted over a quarter of a century. Other contributors included Dave Berg and Joe Kubert from DC Comics. Additionally, Alison Leigh Cowan from The New York Times wrote an article referencing Rabbi Masinter for his role in involving artist Al Jaffee in the children's organization.

In 1985 the Rabbi returned to South Africa to work for Chabad Lubavitch South Africa and was appointed Director of Chabad House Johannesburg in 1989.

In the years that followed, together with his colleague Rabbi Michael Katz, Rabbi Masinter introduced a variety of outreach and educational programmes. In the late 1990s he teamed up with Mike Schalit of the Net#work BBDO advertising agency to develop advertising campaigns aimed at creating and enhancing Jewish awareness.

Miracle Drive
The Miracle Drive was instituted to fund Chabad House in Johannesburg and its spectrum of programmes for all age groups. In 1989, with the support of John Newbury, the Chairman of Nissan South Africa ('Nissan''' means 'miracle' in Hebrew). Nissan donated a car which was raffled, and the tradition has continued every year to the present, with Nissan as the chief sponsor. Today the Miracle Drive is claimed to be the biggest charity event in the southern hemisphere, drawing up to 1800 people to its annual gala dinner.

Meyer Kahn, former CEO of SAB is the current President of Miracle Drive. Some of the notable Miracle Drive Chairmen have included Larry Lipschitz, former Chairman of Supergroup and Robert Brozin, Chairman of Nandos. The current Chairman is Paul Winer, esteemed partner at ENS Africa.

Grow Your Life book series
Because of challenges facing South Africa's previously disadvantaged children, the Rabbi authored the Grow Your Life series of books aimed at giving children an aspiration.  Over 400,000 copies have been printed. Grow Your Life has also led to the development of job creation programs.

Grow Your Life Library Project
The overall goal of Miracle Drive is to offer assistance and welfare to the greater South African community, and therefore, in continuing with this vision statement, Rabbi Masinter decided to focus some of Miracle Drive's resources on creating mobile libraries throughout a number of informal settlements in Gauteng.

The overall goal of Miracle Drive is to offer assistance and welfare to the greater South African community, and therefore, in continuing with this vision statement, we are dedicated to improving the literacy and education levels in impoverished communities throughout Johannesburg, by developing and installing container libraries in areas where they are most needed.

Each container is equipped with shelving, books (including books in the native language of each community), tables and chairs, and our Grow Your Life series will be an integral element in these libraries.
Each library/classroom will employ a teacher/librarian on a part-time basis in order to facilitate the library, and over time, be responsible for teaching the children how to read themselves, thereby developing the literacy and education levels which as you know are vital in sustaining and growing any community and country.
20 libraries have already opened up in a variety of impoverished areas throughout Gauteng.

ARK Campaign - Acts of Random Kindness 

ARK is an acronym for Acts of Random Kindness. The goal of the campaign is simple – get people to fill up the yellow ARK with spare change, and when full, donate it to someone less fortunate. Basically, to get people to increase in acts of goodness and kindness.

The ARK project is a part of Rabbi Masinter's the Change Our World for Good Campaign. In a world facing immense challenges on a daily basis, it is just about getting people to do good for others, there is no monetary benefit for the Rabbi's organisation.

In addition, a wide variety of some of the country's top corporates have become involved and are actively distributing thousands of ARK's amongst their members of staff and clientele.

The success of the ARK project has seen over 700 000 ARK's distributed by May 2019, and has subsequently inspired Rabbi Masinter to launch new innovative initiatives.

Chabad's Goodness and Kindness Centre
With the help of Natie Kirsh, Rabbi Masinter purchased a small building in Sandton, the heart of South Africa's business capital. Chabad's Goodness and Kindness Centre will be used to bring children from all backgrounds, including those from previously disadvantaged homes, in order to teach them about the value of goodness and kindness.

Personal life
The Rabbi is married to Chaya née Tanzer, daughter of Marcia and Rabbi Avraham Tanzer (Rosh Yeshiva, Yeshiva College, South Africa). They have six children and eight grandchildren.

ReferencesSouth African Jewish Report Front Page 2 July 2010 Volume 14 Number 24South African Jewish Report  Front Page 2 March 2012 Volume 16 Number 7South African Jewish Report  Front Page 25 November 2011 Volume 15 Number 43Shliach Writes Children's Books  2 June 2011Chabad Launches Skills Training Program for Unemployed in Johannesburg  23 February 2011.Diamond in the Rough 30 April 2009.The Kotel Siddur: A Better Experience at Israel’s Western Wall Australian Jewish Leaders Convene for Annual Conference 16 March 2008.As Jews Leave South Africa, Chabad Stays Put 22 September 2008Putting on Teffillin with the Wolf of Wall Street 26 October 2010.Goldstone's Apology and Samantha Power's Problem with Israel 4 April 2011.Real people doing unreal things - Rabbi David Masinter 19 May 2011.Child genius in a small package 17 May 2012.Star Newspaper - ARK can lift a soul out of abject poverty'' 4 September 2014

External links
 Grow Your Life January 2011.

1959 births
Living people
Chabad-Lubavitch rabbis
South African Orthodox rabbis